Alfred Holland (29 January 1900 – 30 August 1936) was a Labour Party politician in England.

He was elected at the 1935 general election as Member of Parliament (MP) for Clay Cross, filling the seat held by Arthur Henderson until his death shortly before the election. Holland died of meningitis only 9 months after his election to the House of Commons, aged 36.

References

External links 
 

1900 births
1936 deaths
Labour Party (UK) MPs for English constituencies
UK MPs 1935–1945
Members of the Parliament of the United Kingdom for constituencies in Derbyshire
Neurological disease deaths in England
Infectious disease deaths in England
Deaths from meningitis